Phloen Chit station is a BTS skytrain station, on the Sukhumvit Line in Pathum Wan District, Bangkok, Thailand. The station is located on Phloen Chit Road at Phloen Chit intersection to Wireless Road next to the beginning of Sukhumvit Road. It is surrounded by hotels, skyscrapers, office towers and many embassies especially the British and American embassies on Wireless Road.

See also
 Bangkok Skytrain

BTS Skytrain stations
Railway stations opened in 1999
1999 establishments in Thailand